During the medieval and later feudal/colonial periods, many parts of the Indian subcontinent were ruled as sovereign or princely states by various dynasties of Rajputs.

The Rajputs rose to political prominence after the large empires of ancient India broke into smaller ones. The Rajputs became prominent in the early medieval period in about seventh century and dominated in regions now known as Rajasthan, Delhi, Haryana, Western Gangetic plains and Bundelkhand.

However, the term "Rajput" has been used as an anachronistic designation for Hindu dynasties before the 16th century because the Rajput identity for a lineage did not exist before this time, and these lineages were classified as aristocratic Rajput clans in the later times. Thus, the term "Rajput" does not occur in Muslim sources before the 16th century.

List
Following is the list of those ruling Rajput dynasties of the Indian Subcontinent:
 Kachhwahas of Jaipur, Alwar, Lawa and Maihar
 Sisodias of Mewar
 Rathores of Jodhpur, Bikaner, Kishangarh, Jhabua, Ratlam, Alirajpur, Idar and Seraikela
 Imperial Pratiharas of Kannauj
 Chauhans (of Sambhar, Nadol, Ranthambore and Jalor)
 Tomara dynasty of Delhi
 Chaulukyas (Solankis) and Vaghelas of Gujarat
 Paramaras of Malwa and Chandravati
 Gahadavalas of Varanasi and Kannauj
 Chandelas of Jejakabhukti (modern Bundelkhand)
 Guhilas of Medapata (modern Mewar)
 Dogra dynasty of Jammu & Kashmir
 Chand dynasty of Kumaon
 Katochs of Kangra
 Panwars of Garhwal
 Sodhas of Amarkot
 Bhatis of Jaisalmer
 Bundelas of Orchha

See also 
 List of Hindu empires and dynasties
 List of Indian monarchs
 Rajputana
 Rajput Rebellion

References

Bibliography 
 

Dynasties
Hindu dynasties
Rajput dynasties
Rajput rulers
Rajput